Malmö Airport, until 2007 known as Sturup Airport  is Sweden's fourth busiest airport, handling 1,975,479 passengers in 2019.

The city of Malmö has roughly the same distance by road to Copenhagen Airport as to Malmö Airport.

History

Early years
Completed in 1972, then at a cost of around SEK130 million, almost twice as much as initially forecast, Sturup Airport replaced the aging Bulltofta Airport, which had served the region since 1923. Plans to build a new airport were drafted in the early 1960s. Expansion was impossible, due to Bulltofta's close proximity to the now booming city and nearby communities complained about noise pollution from the newly introduced jet aircraft.

Construction began in 1970, and the airport was inaugurated two years later on 3 December 1972. At the same time Bulltofta Airport closed. However, Malmö ATC (Air Traffic Control) remained at the old Bulltofta site until 1983 when it also moved to Malmö Airport.

According to the Official Airline Guide (OAG), three airlines were serving the airport in the fall of 1996 including KLM Cityhopper with nonstop Fokker F50 turboprop flights to Amsterdam (AMS), Malmo Aviation with nonstop British Aerospace BAe 146 jet flights to London City Airport (LCY) as well as Stockholm Bromma Airport (BMA), and Scandinavian Airlines System (SAS) with nonstop McDonnell Douglas MD-80 and MD-87 jet flights to Stockholm Arlanda Airport (ARN).

Development since the 2000s
Around 2005–2008 several low-cost airlines hoped to attract both Danish and Swedish passengers to Sturup Airport in competition with Copenhagen Airport. Malmö airport, due to its lower landing fees, is seen by some low-cost airlines as a less expensive way of accessing the Copenhagen area. The airport caters to low-cost carriers such as Wizz Air.

During 2008 Danish Sterling Airlines was operating service from Malmö Airport to London Gatwick Airport (LGW), Alicante, Barcelona, Nice and Florence. However, other low-cost carriers such as easyJet use Copenhagen Airport. Norwegian Air Shuttle uses Malmö Airport for a few flights a day to and from Stockholm Arlanda Airport while the majority of flights to the region go to Copenhagen Airport. In 2014, Ryanair moved their operations to Copenhagen Airport as well.

The Malmö Airport Master Plan from 2018 describes how the airport will develop in the years to come, e.g. by extending the hall for arriving luggage and with new traffic flows to and from the airport. The works are projected in order to allow for a future second passenger terminal, as well as a second, parallel, runway northwest of the present one.

Facilities
Malmö Airport features one passenger and two cargo terminals as well as 20 aircraft stands.

Airlines and destinations

The following airlines operate regular scheduled and charter flights to and from Malmö:

Statistics

Ground transportation

Bus 
Flygbussarna Airport coaches depart from the airport to downtown Malmö. The journey to Malmö takes about 40 minutes. From there, there are train connections to destinations including Copenhagen.
 Gråhundbus coaches departs to Copenhagen 30 minutes after every Ryanair arrival.
 There is also Wizzair's bus to Copenhagen

See also 
List of the largest airports in the Nordic countries

References

External links 

 

Airports in Skåne County
Buildings and structures in Skåne County
Airports established in 1972
Airport
1972 establishments in Sweden
Airports in the Øresund Region
International airports in Sweden